The Reverend Henry Francis Cary (6 December 1772 – 14 August 1844) was a British author and translator, best known for his blank verse translation of The Divine Comedy of Dante.

Biography
Henry Francis Cary was born in Gibraltar, on 6 December 1772. He was the eldest son of Henrietta Brocas and William Cary. Henrietta was the daughter of Theophilus Brocas, Dean of Killala and William, at the time, was a captain of the First Regiment of Foot. His grandfather, Henry Cary was archdeacon, and his great grandfather, Mordecai Cary, bishop of that diocese.

He was educated at Rugby School and at the grammar schools of Sutton Coldfield and Birmingham, as well as at Christ Church, Oxford, which he entered in 1790 and studied French and Italian literature. While at school he regularly contributed to the Gentleman's Magazine, and published a volume of Sonnets and Odes. He took holy orders and in 1797 and became vicar of Abbots Bromley in Staffordshire. He held this benefice until his death. In 1800 he also became vicar of Kingsbury in Warwickshire.

At Christ Church he studied French and Italian literature, his command of which is evidenced in his notes to his translation of Dante. The version of the Inferno was published in 1805 together with the original text.

Cary moved to London in 1808, where he became reader at the Berkeley Chapel and subsequently, lecturer at Chiswick and curate of the Savoy Chapel. His version of the whole Divina Commedia in blank verse appeared in 1814. It was published at Cary's own expense, as the publisher refused to undertake the risk, owing to the failure incurred over the Inferno.

The translation was brought to the notice of Samuel Rogers by Thomas Moore. Rogers made some additions to an article on it by Ugo Foscolo in the Edinburgh Review. This article, and praise bestowed on the work by Coleridge in a lecture at the Royal Institution, led to a general acknowledgment of its merit. Cary's Dante gradually took its place among standard works, passing through four editions in his lifetime.

In 1833, Cary was granted six months' leave of absence because of illness and travelled with his manservant and his son, Francis, to Italy visiting Amiens, Paris, Lyons, Aix, Nice, Mentone, Genoa, Pisa, Florence, Sienna, Rome (a month), Naples, Bologna, Verona, Venice (a month), Innsbruck, Munich, Nuremberg, Frankfurt, Cologne, Rotterdam, The Hague, Amsterdam, Brussels, Ghent, and Bruges.

In 1824, Cary published a translation of The Birds of Aristophanes, and, about 1834, he published his translation of the Odes of Pindar. In 1826 he was appointed assistant-librarian in the British Museum, a post that he held for about eleven years. He resigned because the appointment of keeper of the printed books, which should have been his in the ordinary course of promotion, was refused to him when it fell vacant. In 1841 a crown pension of £200 a year, obtained through the efforts of Samuel Rogers, was conferred on him.

Cary's Lives of the early French Poets, and Lives of English Poets (from Samuel Johnson to Henry Kirke White), intended as a continuation of Johnson's Lives of the Poets, were published in collected form in 1846. He died in Charlotte St., St. George's, Bloomsbury, London, in 1844 and was buried in Poets' Corner, Westminster Abbey.

A memoir was published by his son, Judge Henry Cary, in 1847. Another son, Francis Stephen Cary, became a well-known art teacher, succeeding Henry Sass as the head of his art academy in London.

See also
 English translations of Homer: Henry Francis Cary
 List of Gibraltarians

References

External links 
 
 
 Cary's translation of Dante side by side with those of Longfellow and Norton

1772 births
1844 deaths
Alumni of Christ Church, Oxford
Italian–English translators
Translators of Dante Alighieri
English essayists
English translators
People educated at Rugby School
Burials at Westminster Abbey
Gibraltarians
Employees of the British Museum
Male essayists
English male poets